The 2003 Speedway Grand Prix Qualification or GP Challenge was a series of motorcycle speedway meetings used to determine the 6 riders that would qualify for the 2003 Speedway Grand Prix to join the other 16 riders that finished in the leading positions from the 2002 Speedway Grand Prix.

Only 6 riders would qualify through the GP Challenge once again but there was a major change in the lead up to the GP Challenge with a new qualifying format of 4 quarter finals and 2 semi finals. The Intercontinental Final, Continental Final, Overseas Final and Scandinavian Finals were all scrapped.

Lee Richardson won the GP Challenge.

Format
 First Round (7 riders from Poland to quarter final, 6 from Sweden & Great Britain, 5 from Denmark & Czech Republic, 4 from Australia & Germany, 3 riders from United States, Hungary, Italy, Russia & Slovenia, 2 from Norway, Finland, Latvia, 1 rider each from Austria, Canada, Croatia, France, Netherlands and Ukraine)
 Quarter finals - 32 riders to semi finals
 Semi finals - 16 riders to GP Challenge
 Final Round - 6 riders from the GP Challenge to the 2003 Grand Prix

Quarter finals
32 riders to semi finals

Semi finals
16 riders from to GP Challenge

Final Round

GP Challenge
6 riders to 2003 Grand Prix
25 August 2002  Piła

race off for 3rd place - Protasiewicz, Dryml, B Pedersen, Bajerski

References 

Speedway Grand Prix Qualification
Speedway Grand Prix Qualifications